The 1983 Kentucky Derby was the 109th running of the Kentucky Derby. The race took place on May 7, 1983, with 134,444 people in attendance.

Full results

 Winning breeder: David J. Foster (ON)

References

1983
Kentucky Derby
Derby
Kentucky
Kentucky Derby